Usisha is a rural locality (a selo) and the administrative centre of Usishinsky Selsoviet, Akushinsky District, Republic of Dagestan, Russia. The population was 3,932 as of 2010. There are 12 streets.

Geography 
Usisha is located 8 km southeast of Akusha (the district's administrative centre) by road. Aynikabmakhi is the nearest rural locality.

References 

Rural localities in Akushinsky District